Brassó may refer to:

 Brassó, the Hungarian name for Brașov, present-day Romania
 Brassó County, a county of the Kingdom of Hungary from 1876 to 1920 with the above city as county seat
 Brassó, the Hungarian name for Brăşeu village, Zam Commune, Hunedoara County, Romania

See also
 Brasso, a metal polish designed to remove tarnish from brass, copper, chrome and stainless steel